SS Royal S. Copeland was a Liberty ship built in the United States during World War II. She was named after Royal S. Copeland, a United States senator from New York from 1923 until 1938, was an academic, homeopathic physician, and politician.

Construction
Royal S. Copeland was laid down on 24 November 1943, under a Maritime Commission (MARCOM) contract, MC hull 1219, by the St. Johns River Shipbuilding Company, Jacksonville, Florida; and was launched on 11 January 1944.

History
She was allocated to Parry Navigation Co., on 22 January 1944. On 7 June 1946, she was laid up in the James River Reserve Fleet, Jones Point, New York. She was sold, 8 November 1946, to France, for $544,506, for commercial use. She was removed from the fleet on 13 December 1946.

Royal S. Copeland was renamed Les Glieres in 1947. She was sold to Cia. Estrella Blanca, in 1959, reflagged in Lebanon, and renamed Nictric. On 14 June 1967, her cargo of coal caught fire in Chittagong Roads. She was scrapped in 1968 in Taiwan.

References

Bibliography

 
 
 
 

 

Liberty ships
Ships built in Jacksonville, Florida
1944 ships
Hudson River Reserve Fleet
Liberty ships transferred to France